The Prom is a piano-driven indie band.  Chris Walla (of Death Cab for Cutie) has done mixing for The Prom (the 3-song EP Saloon Song) and they are on the Barsuk label which Death Cab For Cutie was with until 2005.  The core of their sound is electric bass, piano and drums but their recordings sometimes also include organ, toy piano, synthesizer, guitar, violin, cello, flute, trumpet, and trumpet.  The three members all contribute on vocals and on the organ.

History
The Prom was formed in Seattle, Washington in 1999 by James Mendenhall and David Broecker, who had previously played together in their home town of Omaha, Nebraska. Joel Brown, an audio engineer, was soon brought on to play drums.

Their debut album, In This Way They Found Me, was released on Portland, Oregon's Panther Fact Records in 2000. In 2001 they played west coast shows with Rainer Maria, Gorky's Zygotic Mynci and Bright Eyes. After releasing Saloon Song on Barsuk, they played a 2001 national tour with Death Cab. The trio's second record, Under The Same Stars, was released in 2002 and prompted comparisons to Elton John, Death Cab for Cutie, and The Black Heart Procession.

A set of demos was recorded in 2003 by Joel Brown and intended for the band's next full-length, but soon after recording the band broke up and the full-length never materialized. Over fifteen years later, in the early hours of January 1, 2019, James Mendenhall collapsed as a result of a long-dormant heart condition while celebrating New Year's Eve with friends in Portland. A few months later, the surviving members of the band had the notion that it might be nice for people to hear those unreleased demos from years ago, and Demos 2003 was released, along with a newly edited lyric video with tour footage from the period.

Members
James Mendenhall - vocals, piano, organ, guitar, toy piano, and synthesizer
Joel Brown - vocals, drums, organ, and tambourine   
David Broecker - vocals, bass, organ, and shaker

Discography
(2001) In This Way They Found Me (Panther Fact Records)
(2001) Saloon Song (Barsuk)
(2002) Under The Same Stars (Barsuk)
(2019) Demos 2003 (Barsuk)

References

Indie rock musical groups from Washington (state)
Musical groups from Seattle
Barsuk Records artists